The Fly-class river gunboats (or small China gunboats), collectively often referred to as the "Tigris gunboat flotilla", were a class of small well-armed Royal Navy vessels designed to patrol the Tigris river during the Mesopotamian Campaign during the First World War (the China name was to disguise their function).

Design
They were fitted with one triple expansion steam engine driving one propeller housed in a tunnel to facilitate a very shallow [] draught. The boats were designed to be dismantled and re-assembled.

Deployment
The vessels were built by Yarrow Shipbuilders at Scotstoun, Glasgow in 1915 and 1916 and shipped to Abadan in sections where they were assembled. They served with the Royal Navy patrolling the Tigris River until being transferred to the Army during 1918. They were sold off beginning 1923.

The Ottomans captured Firefly in December 1915 after she grounded and a shell through her boiler disabled her; her crew was evacuated. The Ottomans took her into service as Suleiman Pak.  recaptured her at the Battle of Nahr-al-Kalek on 26 February 1917.

Vessels
Vessels with the prefix "HM Gunboat"

 Blackfly
 Butterfly
 Caddisfly
 Cranefly
 Dragonfly
 Firefly
 Gadfly
 Grayfly
 Greenfly
 Hoverfly
 Mayfly
 Sawfly
 Sedgefly
 Snakefly
 Stonefly
 Waterfly

See also
 Mesopotamian campaign
 Tigris River

Notes

Citations

References

External links

 British Forces in Mesopotamia not including Kut Al Amara 3 January 1916 
 "The Tigris Flotilla", at Great War Primary Document Archive

Gunboat classes
Gunboats of the United Kingdom
World War I gunboats
Gunboats of the Royal Navy